Grace Elvina Curzon, Marchioness Curzon of Kedleston, GBE (née Hinds, formerly Duggan; 14 April 1879 – 29 June 1958) was an American-born British marchioness and the second wife of George Curzon, former Viceroy of India.

Early life 
Curzon was born Grace Elvina Hinds in 1879 in Decatur, Alabama, a daughter of Joseph Monroe Hinds (1842–1901), former U.S. Consul General to Brazil in Rio de Janeiro, and Lucia Annita Trillia (1851–1941), a former British subject from Montevideo, Uruguay.

Grace grew up in a "great colonial mansion with 'banks of roses, and although her father was a resident of Alabama, he fought with the Union Army as a captain of a cavalry company during the American Civil War.  The family "had a flair for social life," travelling often and introducing Grace to the prominent people of the age, including U.S. President Grover Cleveland at the White House.

Marriages and issue

First marriage 
On 1 May 1902, she married her first husband, Alfredo Huberto Duggan (1875–1915), a first generation Irish Argentinian from Buenos Aires.  In 1905, Duggan was appointed to the Argentine Legation in London where the family thereafter moved. Together, they were the parents of three children, two sons and a daughter:
 Alfred Duggan (1903–1964), a historical novelist who was the best-selling historical novelist during the 1950s.
 Hubert Duggan (1904–1943), who later became a British Member of Parliament and married Joan Dunn, the daughter of Sir James Dunn.
 Grace Duggan (1907–1995), who married Edward Rice, and was the mother of Caroline Helen Rice (b. 1931), wife of Robert Windsor-Clive, 3rd Earl of Plymouth.

When Grace was presented at Court, she stood behind fellow American Nancy Langhorne Shaw, who later became Viscountess Astor upon her marriage to Waldorf Astor, 2nd Viscount Astor in 1906 (and later an MP in her own right).  She was also a friend of Lady Randolph Churchill, the American-born mother of Winston Churchill, and Consuelo Vanderbilt, the wife of the 9th Duke of Marlborough.

Grace Duggan was a wealthy woman after her husband's death in 1915, inheriting an estate of more than $18,000,000, which included eighteen large estancias in South America.  In 1916, Philip Alexius de László painted her as a widow.

Second marriage 

On 2 Jan 1917, aged 32, she became the second wife of Lord Curzon. On the occasion of their marriage, Lord Curzon bought Bodiam Castle in East Sussex, a 14th-century building that had been gutted during the English Civil War. They restored it extensively, then bequeathed it to the National Trust. In 1923, when Curzon was passed over for the office of Prime Minister partly on the advice of Arthur Balfour, Balfour joked that Curzon 'has lost the hope of glory but he still possesses the means of Grace".

Curzon had three daughters from his first marriage to Mary Victoria Leiter, Baroness Curzon of Kedleston: Mary Irene, Lady Ravensdale (born 20 January 1896); Cynthia Blanche (born 23 August 1898), the first wife of Sir Oswald Mosley; and Alexandra Naldera (born 20 April 1904), the wife of Edward Dudley Metcalfe, the best friend, best man and equerry of King Edward VIII.

Despite her fertility-related operations and several miscarriages, the couple did not produce an heir. This eroded their marriage, which ended in separation but not divorce. Letters from Curzon to Grace in the early 1920s indicate that they remained devoted to each other. However, Oswald Mosley admitted privately to he had an affair with Lady Curzon, as well as with her step-daughters, Alexandra and Irene.

Later life 
In the 1922 New Year Honours List, she was appointed Dame Grand Cross of the Order of the British Empire (GBE) for "services rendered during the War to the British Red Cross Society, and to the Soldiers' and Sailors' Families Association, the Belgian -Soldiers' Club, and Queen Alexandra's Nursing' Association."

In 1925, her portrait was painted by the American artist John Singer Sargent. This oil on canvas painting, which measures , was Sargent's last oil portrait. The painting was purchased in 1936 by the Currier Museum of Art in Manchester, New Hampshire.

Lady Curzon died on 29 June 1958 near Dover in Kent.

References 

1885 births
1958 deaths
American emigrants to England
British marchionesses
Dames Grand Cross of the Order of the British Empire
Grace
Naturalised citizens of the United Kingdom
Paintings by John Singer Sargent
People from Huntsville, Alabama
American people of Uruguayan descent
American people of British descent
British people of Uruguayan descent
Wives of knights